A vixen is usually a stereotype of women as mysterious, racy, salacious, and seductive. It is used as an archetype and stock character in literature and art. Vixens are commonly identified with dark hair and makeup, their sex appeal, and seductress personas.

References

Female stock characters
Slang terms for women
Stereotypes of women
Cultural depictions of women